The Nuisance is a 1933 American pre-Code film starring Lee Tracy as a lawyer, Madge Evans as his love interest (with a secret), and Frank Morgan as his accomplice.

Plot summary

Cast
 Lee Tracy as Joseph Phineas "Joe" Stevens
 Madge Evans as Dorothy Mason
 Frank Morgan as Dr. Buchanan Prescott
 Charles Butterworth as "Floppy" Phil Montague
 John Miljan as John Calhoun
 Virginia Cherrill as Miss Rutherford
 David Landau as Kelley
 Greta Meyer as Mrs. Mannheimer
 Herman Bing as Willy
 Samuel Hinds as Mr. Beaumont
 Syd Saylor as Fred

References

External links
 
 
 
 

American romantic comedy-drama films
American black-and-white films
Films directed by Jack Conway
1930s legal films
Metro-Goldwyn-Mayer films
American legal films
1930s romantic comedy-drama films
1933 comedy films
1933 drama films
1933 films
1930s American films